The 1985 Central Michigan Chippewas football team represented Central Michigan University in the Mid-American Conference (MAC) during the 1985 NCAA Division I-A football season. In their eighth season under head coach Herb Deromedi, the Chippewas compiled a 7–3 record (6–3 against MAC opponents), finished in third place in the MAC standings, and outscored their opponents, 194 to 143. The team played its home games in Kelly/Shorts Stadium in Mount Pleasant, Michigan, with attendance of 96,735 in five home games.

The team's statistical leaders included quarterback Ron Fillmore with 1,191 passing yards, Tony Brown with 655 rushing yards, and John DeBoer with 494 receiving yards. Cornerback Carl Kloosterman and outside linebacker Steve Sklenar received the team's most valuable player award. Three Central Michigan players (Kloosterman, Sklenar, and offensive guard Rick Poljan) received first-team All-MAC honors.

Schedule

References

Central Michigan
Central Michigan Chippewas football seasons
Central Michigan Chippewas football